Dimorphoptychia is an extinct genus of land snails with an operculum, terrestrial gastropod mollusks in the family Helicinidae.

Dimorphoptychia is the type genus of the subfamily Dimorphoptychiinae, which is likewise fully extinct today.

Species 
Species within the genus Dimorphoptychia include:
 Dimorphoptychia? changzhouensis Yu, 1977

References 

Helicinidae
Eocene gastropods